OFK Spartak is a Bulgarian municipal association football club from the city of Pleven founded on 10 September 1919. It currently competes in the Second League, the second tier of Bulgarian football. The team's greatest achievements are the Bulgarian Cup final in 1957 and the third place in the Bulgarian Championship during the following season.

Spartak was once among the most prominent and consistent teams in the Bulgarian A Group. Between 1952 and 1988, Spartak only missed 5 seasons of top flight football. However, after 1989, a decline began in the club, and Spartak has not played in the A Group since the 2001–02 season.

History

Spartak Pleven was created in 1919, by a student from Pleven, Dragomir Nestorov. He along with a couple of friends founded the club under the name "Skobelov".

The year 1931 remains important for the club's history. This is because then the club changed its name to "Belite Orli". In 1941, the club was given their first ground by the Pleven municipality.

Things began to change in 1944, when the new government in Bulgaria began to interfere in sports as well. In 1946, it was decided that Belite Orli should be renamed to "Republikanec". However, the fans of the club were against the new name and in a meeting, it was decided to change the team's name to "Spartak Pleven", which it still carries today. In 1949, other football teams began to appear in the city, such as "Lokomotiv" and "General Vinarov". However, it was decided that all the teams should be united into one, strong team, so the name "Septemvri" was given to the new team. The team even managed to promote to the elite the same year. However, less than a year later, it was decided that Spartak Pleven would separate and act as a club on its own.

It was decided that there would be a qualifying tournament for the club's in Pleven to decide which team would participate on a professional level. Torpedo Pleven won that tournament and went to A PFG, while Spartak would start from the regional groups. However, the team quickly managed to promote back to professional football, gaining a place in the Bulgarian elite by 1951. Beginning in 1952, Spartak became a consistent member of the Bulgarian top tier. In 1958, Spartak achieved its greatest success, finishing third. Only two seasons later, however, Spartak was relegated, ending a nine year stay in the A Group.

It didn’t take long for Spartak to return to the top level. The team finished first in the 1961 B Group, thus promoting back after just one year in the second level. The next five seasons were spent in the A Group, although a 7th place finish was the most that Spartak could achieve. In 1966, the team was relegated again to the B Group. Spartak was again among the best teams in the second level, finishing first once more in 1967, thus returning back to A Group.

Beginning in the 1967-68 season, Spartak managed another nine year stay in the A Group. This period wasn’t however remembered for any significant results, as two nine-placed finishes in 1971 and 1975 were the best the team could achieve. Another relegation followed at the end of the 1976-77 season. This time it took two seasons for Spartak to return to the A Group.

The next five seasons were spent in the A Group. Although Spartak managed to produce some noteworthy results, the club was also involved in bribery schemes with other teams from the elite, which resulted in an administrative relegation in 1983. Spartak originally finished 5th. The team managed to recover quickly though, returning to the A Group after just one year. Spartak managed to remain in the top level for four more seasons, although it mostly placed towards the bottom of the table, eventually relegating after the 1987–88 A Group season.

The next eight years were spent outside the top level. Spartak was in serious danger of relegating to the third tier on some occasions, such as the 1989-90 season, when Spartak finished 12th. Spartak eventually began improving its performance in the upcoming years, eventually managing to earn promotion back to the A Group at the end of the 1995-96 season. Spartak only managed to stay two years in the top level, again dropping to the second level after the 1997–98 A Group. It took three years for Spartak to again regain its status in the top level. The 2001–02 A Group season ended in relegation, however.  

To date, the 2001-02 season remains the last one for Spartak in the A Group. Since then, Spartak Pleven has been bouncing between the second and third tiers.

The record low came in 2009, when the club declared bankruptcy. This led to Spartak being reformed and started playing from the amateur leagues. In 2012, Spartak returned to the second level, but an immediate relegation followed. Another promotion to the B Group came in 2015, but again this was short-lived, with relegation coming in 2017.

At the end of the 2018-19 season, Spartak finished first in the North-West third league and managed to gain promotion to the second tier for the 2019-20 season. The team, however, experienced difficulties in the second tier, both financially and performance wise. Spartak largely remained in the relegation zone, struggling to survive. They were even deducted three points for not showing on a game. In May 2020, the Bulgarian Football Union decided to cancel the remainder of the season due to the coronavirus epidemic outbreak in Bulgaria. At the time, Spartak was in 16th place (second to last), which meant relegation to the third tier, after just one year in the second league.

After two seasons in the Third League, Spartak returned to the second level as champions of the 2021-22 Northwest Third League.

Colours
Spartak Pleven's colours are blue and white.

Honours
First League:
  Third place:  1958
Second League:
  Winners (5): 1960–61, 1966–67, 1977–78, 1983–84, 2000–01
Third League:
   Winners (4): 2011–12, 2014–15, 2018–19, 2021–22
Bulgarian Cup:
   Runners-up: 1957
Cup of the Soviet Army
   Runners-up: 1987

League positions

Players 

For recent transfers, see Transfers summer 2022.

Past seasons

European Record

Matches

Notable stats

References

External links 
 Official website

Association football clubs established in 1919
Spartak Pleven
 
1919 establishments in Bulgaria